Michèle Demys (born 16 September 1943 in Orsay) is a former French athlete, who specialised in the Javelin.

Demys won five French national javelin titles in 1962, 1963, 1964, 1965 and 1967.

She participated in the 1964 Olympic Games in Tokyo and placed tenth in the final.

National titles 
 French Athletics Championships, 5-time winner in the javelin:

Records

References 
  Docathlé2003, French Athletics Federation, 2003 p. 399

External links 
 
 

1943 births
Living people
French female javelin throwers
Olympic athletes of France
Athletes (track and field) at the 1964 Summer Olympics
Universiade medalists in athletics (track and field)
Universiade silver medalists for France
Medalists at the 1965 Summer Universiade
Medalists at the 1967 Summer Universiade
21st-century French women
20th-century French women